The tournament was played on a hard surface. Due to the ongoing COVID-19 pandemic and many ATP tournaments having been cancelled, this year's event was upgraded to ATP 500 level.

Daniil Medvedev was the defending champion, but lost in the second round to Reilly Opelka.

Andrey Rublev won the title, defeating last year finalist Borna Ćorić in the final, 7–6(7–5), 6–4.

Seeds

Draw

Finals

Top half

Bottom half

Qualifying

Seeds

Qualifiers

Lucky losers

Qualifying draw

First qualifier

Second qualifier

Third qualifier

Fourth qualifier

References

Main Draw
Qualifying Draw

St. Petersburg Open – Singles
2020 Singles